More Than a Woman may refer to:

 More Than a Woman (album), a 2002 album by Toni Braxton
 "More Than a Woman" (Aaliyah song), 2001
 "More Than a Woman" (Angie Stone song), a song by Angie Stone from the 2001 album Mahogany Soul
 "More Than a Woman" (Bee Gees song), 1977; covered by:
 Tavares on the 1978 album Future Bound
 911 on the 1999 album There It Is
 "More Than a Woman", a 1941 short story by Pearl S. Buck

See also
 Nothing More Than a Woman, a 1934 American drama film